"Crazy Little Party Girl" is the second single from Aaron Carter's self-titled debut album, Aaron Carter. While failing to chart in the United States, the single found success in European countries, such as the United Kingdom, Denmark, Norway, and Sweden, reaching the top 10 in all three countries. In Sweden, it was certified Gold for shipping over 15,000 copies.

Track listing
CD single
 "Crazy Little Party Girl" (Main mix) – 3:26
 "Crazy Little Party Girl" (One Day mix) – 2:54
 "Crazy Little Party Girl" (Instrumental) – 3:26
 "Crazy Little Party Girl" interview – 5:07

Charts

Weekly charts

Year-end charts

Certifications

References

1998 singles
Aaron Carter songs
UK Independent Singles Chart number-one singles
Songs with lyrics by Mary Susan Applegate
1997 songs